Anthony Myles may refer to:

 Anthony Myles (basketball, born 1982), American basketball player
 Anthony Myles (basketball, born 1992), American basketball player